Nicole Grimaudo (born 22 April 1980, in Caltagirone, Sicily, Italy) is an Italian actress. She began her career on the Italian television show "Non è la Rai" in 1994–1995, and later moved to TV and cinema films and theatre.

Her theatre roles include "Il giardino dei ciliegi" in 1995 directed by Gabriele Lavia, and Amadeus in 1999, directed by Roman Polanski.

Filmography

Films

Television

References

External links

1980 births
Living people
People from Caltagirone
Italian film actresses
Italian television actresses
Italian stage actresses
20th-century Italian actresses
21st-century Italian actresses
Actors from Sicily